The 2008 congressional elections in Rhode Island were held on November 4, 2008 to determine who will represent Rhode Island in the United States House of Representatives, coinciding with the presidential and senatorial elections. Representatives are elected for two-year terms; those elected will serve in the 111th Congress from January 3, 2009 until January 3, 2011.

Rhode Island has two seats in the House, apportioned according to the 2000 United States Census. Its 2007-2008 congressional delegation consisted of two Democrats, both of whom were re-elected in 2008. Thus, no districts changed party. CQ Politics forecasted both districts as "safe" for the incumbent party.

Overview

District 1

This district covers the northern and East Bay sections of the state. Democratic incumbent Patrick J. Kennedy, who has represented this seat since 1995, won against Republican nominee Jonathan Scott. CQ Politics forecasted the race as 'Safe Democrat'.

District 2

This district covers the areas roughly south and west of Providence. Democratic incumbent Jim Langevin, who has represented this seat since 2001, won against Republican nominee Mark Zaccaria. CQ Politics forecasted the race as 'Safe Democrat'.

References

External links
Rhode Island Board of Elections
U.S. Congress candidates for Rhode Island at Project Vote Smart
Rhode Island U.S. House Races from 2008 Race Tracker
Campaign contributions for Rhode Island congressional races from OpenSecrets

2008
Rhode Island
United States House of Representatives